Legend of the White Hair Brides is a Singaporean television series adapted from the wuxia novels Baifa Monü Zhuan, Saiwai Qixia Zhuan and Qijian Xia Tianshan by Liang Yusheng. It was first broadcast on TCS-8 in 1996 in Singapore.

Plot
The story is set in the early Qing dynasty. Zhuo Yihang of the Wudang Sect is in love with Lian Nichang, but Zhuo's fellows strongly oppose their relationship and cause them to break up. Lian is heartbroken and her hair turns white overnight. She becomes known as the "White Haired Demoness". Zhuo is unwilling to give up his love for Lian and seeks a rare flower that can turn white hair black again. However, the flower only blooms once every six decades. After a long search, Zhuo finally finds the flower on Mount Heaven, but it is accidentally destroyed by his apprentice, Xin Longzi.

Around the same time, Reverend Huiming of the Mount Heaven Sect accepts two boys, Yang Yuncong and Chu Zhaonan, as his students. Several years later, the boys have grown up to become formidable swordsmen. Yang meets Nalan Minghui, the daughter of a Qing general, and falls in love with her after she saved his life once. They secretly conceive a daughter, Yilan Zhu, but can never be together as Nalan's parents have betrothed her to Prince Dodo. Concurrently, "Flying Red Sash" Hamaya, the White Haired Demoness's apprentice, also develops a crush on Yang, but Yang rejects her love. Hamaya is heartbroken and her hair turns white overnight, just like her teacher before her. She takes the baby Yilan Zhu away in anger and adopts her as a student.

In the meantime, Yang's junior, Chu Zhaonan, is tempted by fame and wealth, and he betrays his sect to serve the Qing imperial court. More than 20 years later, the grown-up Yilan Zhu is unable to escape her fate of following in her predecessors' footsteps, and her hair also turns white. Yang Yuncong and Hamaya meet again on Mount Heaven and they defeat Chu Zhaonan together. Yilan Zhu wants to help her father reconcile with Hamaya, but they refuse and decide to go separate ways.

Cast
 Huang Biren as Lian Nichang
 Lina Ng as Hamaya
 Ann Kok as Nalan Minghui / Yilan Zhu
 Jason Oh as Yang Yuncong
 Shen Huihao as Chu Zhaonan
 Yuan Wenqing as Zhuo Yihang
 Zheng Wenquan as Zhang Huazhao
 Liang Weidong as Prince Dodo
 Ge Hongfa as Reverend Huiming

See also
 Seven Swordsmen

External links

1996 Singaporean television series debuts
1990s Singaporean television series
Singaporean wuxia television series
Works based on Baifa Monü Zhuan
Television series set in the Qing dynasty
Television shows based on works by Liang Yusheng
Channel 8 (Singapore) original programming